Nicolas Osseland (born 22 August 1978) is a French former pair skater. With Sabrina Lefrançois, he placed fourth at the 1997 World Junior Championships, 12th at the 1997 European Championships, and 17th at the 1998 Winter Olympics. He later competed with Marie-Pierre Leray.

Following his retirement from competition, he began coaching in Luxembourg.

Results

With Lefrançois

With Leray

External links
 
 Official site of Marie-Pierre Leray and Nicolas Osseland

1978 births
French male pair skaters
Figure skaters at the 1998 Winter Olympics
Olympic figure skaters of France
Living people
People from Laxou
Sportspeople from Meurthe-et-Moselle
Competitors at the 2001 Winter Universiade